Helias was an Irish Roman Catholic priest: he is the earliest known Archdeacon of Meath.

References
�

12th-century Irish Roman Catholic priests
Archdeacons of Meath